Trešnjevka is a neighborhood of Zagreb, Croatia. Forming one of the city's inner neighborhoods, it is located in the city's southwestern area. At approximately 15.67 km² in area and a population of slightly over 121,000, it is one of the most densely populated areas of the country.

It is administratively divided into two districts:
 Trešnjevka - sjever (Trešnjevka - north)
 Including the neighbourhoods (mjesni odbori) of: Stara Trešnjevka, Ljubljanica, Rudeš, Voltino, Pongračevo etc.
 Trešnjevka - jug (Trešnjevka - south)
 Including the neighbourhoods (mjesni odbori) of: Knežija, Horvati, Srednjaci, Jarun, Staglišće, Gredice, Vrbani, Rudeš etc.

References

 
Districts of Zagreb